Štefan Škaper (born 6 October 1966) is a retired Slovenian football forward. He played for Beltinci between 1990 and 1996 and Mura between 1996 and 2000. Škaper was the Slovenian PrvaLiga top goalscorer for two consecutive seasons in 1993–94 and 1994–95, scoring 23 and 25 goals, respectively. Škaper was capped for the Slovenian national team between 1994 and 1995, earning four caps. Škaper is the second all-time top goalscorer in the Slovenian PrvaLiga with 130 goals. He holds the record for the most hat-tricks in Slovenian top division, with eight. In addition, he is one of two players who scored a record five goals in a single Slovenian league match.

References

External links
PrvaLiga profile  

1966 births
Living people
Slovenian footballers
Association football forwards
Prekmurje Slovenes
Slovenian PrvaLiga players
Slovenian Second League players
NK Beltinci players
NK Mura players
Slovenia international footballers
Slovenian football managers